Between 1929 and 1995, the composition of Armenia's administrative subdivisions consisted of up to 37 raions (districts) and 22 cities. Originally formed from the territory of the tsarist uezds (counties) between 24 June 1929 and 1930, the districts of the Armenian Soviet Socialist Republic and later the independent Republic of Armenia were combined on 11 April 1995 into ten provinces known as marzer, in addition to Yerevan which being the capital of the country was granted a special administrative status. Prior to the establishment of the raions, Soviet Armenia consisted of nine uezds, three of which (Dilijan, Meghri, and Lori-Pambak) were formed after the Sovietization of Armenia and the 1921 delineation of the South Caucasian republics' frontiers.

Districts

Cities 

The six cities that are bolded had the status of a city council.

Notes

References 

Administrative divisions
 
Armenia
Armenia
Armenia
Armenia
Districts of Armenia